Marguerite Young Alexander (March 1, 1889 – December 3, 1954) was one of the founders of Delta Sigma Theta Sorority, Incorporated.

Young was born in Springfield, Illinois, the fourth child and only daughter of James William Young, a hotel waiter, by his wife, Minnie. Marguerite's brother, Roy Young, was a 1912 graduate of Northwestern University receiving his DDS. He practiced dentistry in Evanston for 35 years before his death in 1946. 

Young was a student of romance and classical languages at Howard University, where she graduated in 1913. While there she participated in numerous campus activities including the co-founding of Delta Sigma Theta. She married a dentist named Waldo Alexander and was also a charter member of Delta Sigma Theta's Lambda Chapter, based in her hometown of Chicago.

She died in Chicago.

References

Delta Sigma Theta founders
Howard University alumni
People from Chicago
People from Springfield, Illinois
1889 births
1954 deaths